Butyryl phosphate is an intermediate in the fermentation of butyric acid. The glutamate oxidation of butyryl phosphate may provide the main source of energy for Clostridium tetanomorphum.

See also
Butyric acid

References

Butyrate esters
Organophosphates
Acid anhydrides
Phosphate esters